Priyanka Bhivaji Garkhede (born 13 August 1993) is an Indian cricketer who currently plays for Maharashtra. She plays primarily as a right-arm medium bowler. She has previously played for West Zone, as well as being part of the India C squad in the 2021–22 Senior Women's Challenger Trophy. She captained Maharashtra during the 2020–21 season.

Early life and background
Garkhede born in Aurangabad in Maharashtra. Her mother tongue is Marathi. She started playing cricket at the age of 4 and was picked for the Maharashtra team at the age of 12. Her brother kishna played a key role in shaping her cricket career since it was difficult for her as a girl to start playing men dominated game and consider cricket as a career.

References

External links
 
 

1993 births
Living people
Cricketers from Aurangabad, Maharashtra
Maharashtra women cricketers
West Zone women cricketers